There was a nominal total of 20 quota places available (in parasport events only) for triathlon at the 2022 Commonwealth Games; 10 each for men and women.

Rules
Each Commonwealth Games Association (CGA) may qualify up to three places per event, which equates to a maximum quota of six. Nine places per event are determined by the World Triathlon Para Rankings (as of 28 March 2022), with the last spot reserved for a Bipartite Invitation.

All those who qualify are entitled to compete with a guide, which has no impact on quota allocation.

Timeline

Events
Men's PTVI

Women's PTVI

References

Triathlon at the 2022 Commonwealth Games
2020 in triathlon
2021 in triathlon
2022 in triathlon
Qualification for the 2022 Commonwealth Games